Allow Me to Reintroduce Myself is the second extended play (EP) by Swedish singer Zara Larsson. It was released on 5 July 2013, by TEN Music Group and Universal Music Group. This was Larsson's last extended play (EP) before her debut full-length album 1.

Commercial performance 
The album did not chart on any charts worldwide. However, "She's Not Me (Pt. 1)" peaked at number 21 on the Swedish charts and was certified gold in Sweden as well.

Track listing

References

2013 EPs
Zara Larsson albums